The 2016 Turkish Basketball Presidential Cup was the 32nd edition of the Turkish Basketball Presidential Cup. The game was played by the Turkish Basketball League and Turkish Basketball Cup champions Fenerbahçe and the Turkish League runners-up Anadolu Efes.

Anadolu Efes made its 20th appearance, while Fenerbahçe played in its 13th President's Cup and won its 6th title.

Venue

Match details 
President Recep Tayyip Erdoğan was in the attendance for the game. By halftime, Anadolu Efes was looking at a 37–29 deficit. By the end of the game, the difference was stayed the same and Anadolu Efes never really came close to Fenerbahçe. Bobby Dixon, who scored 19 points was named the President's Cup MVP.

References 

Presidents Cup
2016
Turkish Cup 2016